Amorbia humerosana, the white-lined leafroller, is a species of moth of the family Tortricidae. It is found from the Gulf states to the northeastern United States and southeastern Canada.

The length of the forewings is 11–13 mm for males and 12–13.5 mm for females. The ground color of the forewings is dark gray, the median and subterminal fascia paler, varying to a pale brown with a dark costal blotch. The hindwings are brown with a darker patch at the apex. Adults are on wing from March to September.

The larvae feed on Picea glauca, Picea rubens, Pinus species (including Pinus banksiana), Abies balsamea, Larix laricina, Viburnum species, Rhus radicans, Rhus aromatica, Aralia species, Solidago species, Alnus species, Betula species, Castanea dentata, Lindera species, Asparagus officinalis, Gaylussacia species, Malus domestica and Salix species. They roll the leaves of their host plants. Full-grown larvae reach a length of about 25 mm.

References

Moths described in 1860
Sparganothini
Moths of North America